Muratçık can refer to:

 Muratcık, Çınar
 Muratçık, Elâzığ